Ehlers is a German surname. Notable people with the surname include:

 Arthur Ehlers, executive in minor and Major League Baseball
 Beth Ehlers (born 1968), American actress
 Brian Ehlers (born 1978), American professional basketball player
 Bulbs Ehlers (1923–2013), American professional basketball player
 Edvard Ehlers (1863–1937), Danish dermatologist
 Ekkehard Ehlers, an electronic musician
 Ernst Ehlers (1835–1925), a German zoologist
 Hanni Ehlers (born 1954), German translator
 Hermann Ehlers (1904–1954), a German politician
 Jürgen Ehlers (1929–2008), a German physicist
 Otto Ehrenfried Ehlers (1855–1895), a German traveller and writer
 Nikolaj Ehlers (born 1996), Danish ice hockey player
 Tom Ehlers (born 1952), American football player
 Vern Ehlers (1934–2017), American politician
 Walter D. Ehlers (1921–2014), American Medal of Honour recipient
 Uwe Ehlers (born 1975), German footballer

Surnames from given names
German-language surnames